Qodratabad (also Romanized as Qodratābād) is a village in Qohab-e Sarsar Rural District, Amirabad District, Damghan County, Semnan Province, Iran. At the 2006 census, its population was 59, in 22 families.

References 

Populated places in Damghan County